Illegal migration can refer to:
 Illegal immigration
 Illegal emigration